Tai Odiase (born September 21, 1995) is an American professional basketball player for Germani Basket Brescia of the Lega Basket Serie A. Standing at 2.06 m (6'9"), he plays the Center position. After playing four years of college basketball at UIC, Odiase entered the 2018 NBA draft, but he was not selected in the draft's two rounds.

High school career
Odiase played high school basketball at Homewood-Flossmoor High School in Flossmoor, Illinois. He was ranked as a top-25 senior in the state of Illinois and the fifth-best center. Odiase helped the Vikings claim a conference title during his junior season and was named All-Conference. During his senior year, he averaged 17.4 points, 10.4 rebounds and 3.1 blocks per game.

College career
Odiase, a three-year captain, played 130 games at UIC from 2014 to 2018. He started 117 times, including all 102 under Steve McClain leadership. The Glenwood, Ill., native was named the Horizon League Defensive Player as both a junior and senior and he is one of only three players in Horizon League history to be named to the conference's All-Defensive Team three times. Odiase is the all-time leader for both UIC and the Horizon League with 361 career blocks. That number places him tied for 37th on the NCAA's all-time list with Harvey, Ill., native Melvin Ely. As a senior, he averaged 9.3 points, 5.6 rebounds and 3.1 blocks per game.

Professional career
After finishing his college career at UIC, Odiase joined Iberostar Tenerife of the Liga ACB until the end of the season. After going undrafted in the 2018 NBA draft, Odiase joined the Phoenix Suns in the NBA Summer League. Odiase joined Lavrio of the Greek Basket League thereafter. In December 2019, Odiase was acquired by the Greensboro Swarm of the NBA G League. On February 24, 2020, he finished with 14 points, six rebounds and a block against the Long Island Nets. Odiase averaged 4.8 points, 3.7 rebounds and 1.3 blocks per game. On July 22, he signed with BG Göttingen of the Basketball Bundesliga.

On June 14, 2021, he has signed with EWE Baskets Oldenburg of the Basketball Bundesliga.

On July 14, 2022, he signed with Germani Basket Brescia of the Lega Basket Serie A.

References

1995 births
Living people
American expatriate basketball people in Germany
American expatriate basketball people in Greece
American expatriate basketball people in Spain
American men's basketball players
Basketball players from Illinois
BG Göttingen players
CB Canarias players
Centers (basketball)
EWE Baskets Oldenburg players
Greensboro Swarm players
Homewood-Flossmoor High School alumni
Lavrio B.C. players
Liga ACB players
Riesen Ludwigsburg players
Sportspeople from Cook County, Illinois
UIC Flames men's basketball players